Crime Diaries: The Search (Spanish for Historia de un crimen: La búsqueda) is a Mexican streaming television series produced by Dynamo for Netflix. It stars Regina Blandón, Darío Yazbek Bernal and Verónica Bravo, and the story is based on the case of the disappearance and death of 4-year-old girl Paulette Gebara Farah. All 6 episodes of the season became available for streaming on Netflix on 12 June 2020. The series received criticism for its light comedy tone, the poor performance of Yazbek and for omitting all mentions regarding both Paulette's parents' roles in the events.

Cast 
 Regina Blandón as Carolina Tello (character based on Lilly Téllez)
 Darío Yazbek Bernal as Alberto Bazbaz
 Verónica Bravo as Lizette Farah
 Adriana Llabrés as Arlette Farah
 Diana Bovio as Amanda de la Rosa
 Daniel Haddad as Mauricio Gebara
 Adrián Ladrón as Alfredo Castillo
 Ernesto Laguardia as Gilberto Torres (character based on Javier Alatorre)
 Alejandro Calva as Miguel

Episodes

References

External links 
 
 

2020 Mexican television series debuts
Spanish-language Netflix original programming
Television series about dysfunctional families